The Lord's Transfiguration Orthodox Church is an Orthodox church in Pärnu, Estonia. The church belongs to Estonian Apostolic Orthodox Church.

The church was built in 1902–1904. The church was designed by Vladimir Lunski and Karl Klein. In 1904, the church was inaugurated. The building's height is 38 m.

In 1910, the church's congregation had 5757 members; in 1939, 3006 members.

References

Buildings and structures in Pärnu
Churches in Estonia
Eastern Orthodox churches in Estonia